The 2022–23 UEFA Europa Conference League is the second season of the UEFA Europa Conference League, Europe's tertiary club football tournament organised by UEFA.

The final will be played at Fortuna Arena in Prague, Czech Republic. The winners of the 2022–23 UEFA Europa Conference League will automatically qualify for the 2023–24 UEFA Europa League group stage, unless they manage to qualify for the 2023–24 UEFA Champions League group stage.

As the title holders of the Europa Conference League, Roma, qualified for the 2022–23 UEFA Europa League and subsequently progressed to the knockout phase, they were therefore unable to defend their title.

Association team allocation
A total of 177 teams from 54 of the 55 UEFA member associations (excluding Russia) will participate in the 2022–23 UEFA Europa Conference League. The association ranking based on the UEFA country coefficients is used to determine the number of participating teams for each association:
Associations 1–5 each have one team qualify.
Associations 6–17 (except Russia) and 51–55 each have two teams qualify.
Associations 18–50 (except Liechtenstein) each have three teams qualify.
Liechtenstein have one team qualify as they organize only a domestic cup and no domestic league.
Moreover, 18 teams eliminated from the 2022–23 UEFA Champions League and 25 teams eliminated from the 2022–23 UEFA Europa League are transferred to the Europa Conference League.

Association ranking
For the 2022–23 UEFA Europa Conference League, the associations are allocated places according to their 2021 UEFA country coefficients, which takes into account their performance in European competitions from 2016–17 to 2020–21.

Apart from the allocation based on the country coefficients, associations may have additional teams participating in the Europa Conference League, as noted below:
 – Additional teams transferred from the UEFA Champions League
 – Additional teams transferred from the UEFA Europa League

Distribution
The following is the access list for this season. In the default access list, the title holders of the Europa Conference League qualify for the Europa League group stage.

Due to the suspension of Russia for the 2022–23 European season, the following changes to the access list have been made:

 The cup winners of association 16 (Serbia) enter the Europa League instead of the second qualifying round.
 The cup winners of associations 18 (Croatia) and 19 (Switzerland) enter the third qualifying round instead of the second qualifying round.
 The cup winners of associations 30 to 39 (Poland, Slovenia, Slovakia, Liechtenstein, Lithuania, Luxembourg, Bosnia and Herzegovina, Republic of Ireland, North Macedonia and Armenia) enter the second qualifying round instead of the first qualifying round.

Since some changes have been made in the Europa League access list following the qualification of the Europa Conference League title holders to the Europa League group stage, the following changes to the access list have been made:

 The cup winners of association 17 (Czech Republic) enter the Europa League instead of the second qualifying round.
 The cup winners of association 20 (Greece) enter the third qualifying round instead of the second qualifying round.
 The cup winners of associations 40 (Latvia) and 41 (Albania) enter the second qualifying round instead of the first qualifying round.

Moreover:
 As only 18 out of the planned 20 clubs arrived from the Champions League first qualifying round, two of these teams received a bye to the UECL third qualifying round.

Teams
The labels in the parentheses show how each team qualified for the place of its starting round:
CW: Domestic cup winners
2nd, 3rd, 4th, 5th, 6th, etc.: League position of the previous season
Abd-: League positions of abandoned season as determined by the national association; all teams are subject to approval by UEFA
LC: League cup winners
RW: Regular season winners
PW: End-of-season Europa Conference League play-offs winners
UCL: Transferred from the Champions League
Q1: Losers from the first qualifying round
PR: Losers from the preliminary round (F: final; SF: semi-finals)
UEL: Transferred from the Europa League
GS: Third-placed teams from the group stage
PO: Losers from the play-off round
CH/MP Q3: Losers from the third qualifying round (Champions/Main Path)

The second qualifying round, third qualifying round and play-off round are divided into Champions Path (CH) and Main Path (MP).

CC: 2022 UEFA club coefficients.

One team not playing in a national top division will take part in the competition: Vaduz (2nd tier).

Notes

Schedule
The schedule of the competition is as follows. Matches are scheduled for Thursdays apart from the final, which takes place on a Wednesday, though exceptionally can take place on Tuesdays or Wednesdays due to scheduling conflicts (especially featuring teams from associations where there are few approved stadiums, such as Gibraltar and Wales). Scheduled kick-off times starting from the group stage are 18:45 and 21:00 CEST/CET, though exceptionally can take place at 16:30 due to geographical reasons.

As the 2022 FIFA World Cup took place in Qatar between 20 November and 18 December 2022, the group stage commenced in the first week of September 2022 and concluded in the first week of November 2022 to make way for the World Cup.

The draws for the qualifying round were held at the UEFA headquarters in Nyon, Switzerland. The group stage draw took place in Istanbul, Turkey.

Qualifying rounds

First qualifying round

Second qualifying round

Third qualifying round

Play-off round

Group stage

The draw for the group stage was held on 26 August 2022. The 32 teams were drawn into eight groups of four. For the draw, the teams were seeded into four pots, each of eight teams, based on their 2022 UEFA club coefficients (CC). Teams from the same association and, for political reasons, teams from Serbia and Kosovo could not be drawn into the same group.

All teams besides AZ, Basel, CFR Cluj, Gent, Partizan, Slavia Prague and Slovan Bratislava, who competed in last season's group stage, made their debut appearances in the group stage. Ballkani, Djurgårdens IF, Dnipro-1, Pyunik, RFS, Silkeborg, Slovácko, Vaduz and Žalgiris made their debut appearances in a UEFA competition group stage. Ballkani, Vaduz and Žalgiris were the first teams from Kosovo, Liechtenstein and Lithuania, respectively, to play in a UEFA competition group stage.

A total of 28 national associations were represented in the group stage.

Group A

Group B

Group C

Group D

Group E

Group F

Group G

Group H

Knockout phase

In the knockout phase, teams play against each other over two legs on a home-and-away basis, except for the one-match final.

Bracket

Knockout round play-offs

Round of 16

Quarter-finals

Semi-finals

Final

Statistics
Statistics exclude qualifying rounds and play-off round.

Tables updated as of 16 March 2023.

Top goalscorers

Top assists

See also
2022–23 UEFA Champions League
2022–23 UEFA Europa League
2022–23 UEFA Women's Champions League
2022–23 UEFA Youth League

References

External links

 
3
2022-23
Current association football seasons
Sports events affected by the 2022 Russian invasion of Ukraine